Diplocalyptis congruentana is a species of moth of the family Tortricidae. It is found in the Russian Far East, Korea, Japan, China, Taiwan, and India (Assam.

References

Archipini
Moths of Asia
Moths of Taiwan
Moths described in 1901
Taxa named by Julius von Kennel